The knockout stage of the 2019 Campeonato Paulista began on 23 March with the quarter-finals concluded on 21 April 2019 with the final. A total of eight teams competed in the knockout stage.

Round and draw dates
All draws were held at Federação Paulista de Futebol headquarters in São Paulo, Brazil.

Format
Each tie was played over two legs, with the team with the better ranking in the general table playing the second leg at home. The quarter-finals were played between the winners and runners-up of each group. In the semi-finals, the best ranked team faced the team with the worst remaining ranking, while the second-placed team face the team with the third- best ranking.

Qualified teams

Bracket

Quarterfinals

|}

Quarterfinal A

Quarterfinal B

Quarterfinal C

Quarterfinal D

Semifinals

|}

Semifinal A

Semifinal B

Finals 

|}

First leg

Second leg

References

Campeonato Paulista seasons